Yang Xiaobo (January 1963 – 27 January 2020) was a Chinese structural engineer, politician, and insurance executive. He served as President of the Central South Architectural Design Institute (2003–2007), Mayor of Huangshi, Hubei (2009–2014), and President of Changjiang Property Insurance Company (2014–2020), and was a delegate to the 12th National People's Congress (2013–2018). He died of severe pneumonia during the COVID-19 pandemic in Hubei.

Early life and education
Yang was born in January 1963 in Tianmen, Hubei. He entered Beijing Jiaotong University in 1981, majoring in structural engineering. After earning his bachelor's degree in September 1985, he pursued graduate studies at Tianjin University, earning his master's degree in structural engineering in June 1988. He joined the Communist Party of China in May 1988.

Career
In June 1988, Yang became an engineer at the Central South Architectural Design Institute, where he worked in structural design of industrial and residential buildings. He later earned an MBA degree from Ohio University in the United States. He was promoted to President of the Central South Architectural Design Institute in April 2003, serving until 2007.

Yang entered the Hubei Provincial Government in April 2007 to serve as Director of the Department of Construction. He subsequently studied at the Central Party School of the Communist Party of China from March 2008 to January 2009, and was appointed acting mayor and later Mayor of Huangshi, a prefecture-level city east of Wuhan, in February 2009. He also concurrently served as Deputy Party Secretary of Huangshi. He was a member of the 10th Hubei Provincial Committee of the Communist Party of China and a delegate to the 12th National People's Congress (2013–2018).

In December 2014, Yang was appointed President of Changjiang Property Insurance Company Ltd., a joint venture established in 2011 by China Guodian Corporation together with several state-owned enterprises controlled by the Hubei provincial government. It was headquartered in Wuhan, the capital of Hubei province. Under his leadership, the company signed strategic cooperation agreements with many local governments in Hubei, but also received many citations from the China Banking and Insurance Regulatory Commission for violating industry regulations. It was fined 100,000 yuan in March 2019 for appointing people lacking professional qualifications to top executive positions.

Death 
Yang made his last public appearance on 17 December 2019. On 1 January 2020, he sent a new year's greeting to all employees of Changjiang Property Insurance. On 28 January 2020, Chinese media reported that Yang Xiaobo had died of severe pneumonia at age 57 during the COVID-19 pandemic in Hubei. He was one of the 100 people who had died during the outbreak in Hubei by that date.

References

1963 births
2020 deaths
20th-century Chinese engineers
20th-century Chinese businesspeople
21st-century Chinese engineers
21st-century Chinese businesspeople
21st-century Chinese politicians
Beijing Jiaotong University alumni
Chinese businesspeople in insurance
Chinese chief executives
Chinese structural engineers
Chinese Communist Party politicians from Hubei
Date of death unknown
Deaths from pneumonia in the People's Republic of China
Delegates to the 12th National People's Congress
Mayors of places in China
Ohio University alumni
People's Republic of China politicians from Hubei
Political office-holders in Hubei
Politicians from Tianmen
Tianjin University alumni
Deaths from the COVID-19 pandemic in China